Sometimes I Might Be Introvert is the fourth studio album by British rapper Little Simz, released on 3 September 2021 by Age 101 Music and AWAL. The album succeeds the Mercury Prize-nominated album Grey Area, released in 2019, and the five-track EP, Drop 6 (2020). It is supported by five singles: "Introvert", "Woman", "Rollin Stone", "I Love You, I Hate You" and "Point and Kill". The album is produced by frequent collaborator Inflo, and includes guest appearances from Cleo Sol and Obongjayar. The album received critical acclaim and was named the best album of 2021 by Exclaim! and BBC Radio 6 Music. It won the 2022 Mercury Prize on 18 October 2022. It also won the Libera Award for Best Hip-Hop/Rap Record and was nominated for the Brit Award for British Album of the Year. Sometimes I Might Be Introvert was included in Rolling Stones ranking of the 200 Greatest Hip-Hop Albums of All Time.

Title and concept
The album title is a backronym of Simbi, which is part of Simz's full first name, Simbiatu. Speaking on the album title to The Guardian, Little Simz commented: "I'm just very to myself and I didn't know how to really navigate that, especially coming in this industry where you're expected to have this extroverted persona all the time. I wanted to just let people know like, yo, I'm actually this way inclined […] When it comes to business and my work, I'm not shy at all, I don't hold back with that. I'm very serious and direct, but other stuff sometimes." Thematically, Sometimes I Might Be Introvert is about Simz "being this introverted person that has all these crazy thoughts and ideas and theories in my head and not always feeling like I’m able to express it if it’s not through my art."

Release and promotion
Little Simz announced the album's title, cover art, release date, and preorder on 21 April 2021. The first single, "Introvert", was released alongside its music video on 21 April 2021. The second single, "Woman" featuring Cleo Sol, was released on 6 May 2021 with a music video directed by Little Simz. The track "Rollin Stone" was released as the third single on 14 June 2021, followed by "I Love You, I Hate You" as the fourth single on 8 July 2021. A fifth single, "Point and Kill" featuring Obongjayar, was released on 1 September 2021, followed by a music video.

An accompanying European tour was announced on 28 May 2021, scheduled for winter 2021 and early 2022.

Chart performance
The album debuted at number four on the UK Albums Chart, becoming her highest charting album and first top forty. The album was the biggest selling album in independent record shops the week of its release.

Critical reception

The album received widespread acclaim from critics. At Metacritic, which assigns a normalized rating out of 100 to reviews from professional publications, the album received an average score of 88, based on 24 reviews, indicating "universal acclaim".

In the review for AllMusic Timothy Monger compared the album favourably to its predecessor; "As on Grey Area, there are no dry spells or dips in quality, just a master class in modern songwriting with heaps of poise and a beating, soulful heart." Lee Wakefield for Clash wrote that Sometimes I Might Be Introvert makes for "addictive listening", adding that "the cinematic flourishes are cranked up and Simz is more confessional than ever, pondering what defines her as both Little Simz the artist and Simbi the person." Uncut concluded it was "an even more ambitious conceptual album that finds her sharing her insecurities, praising her heroes and going on a fairytale voyage over 19 tracks." Writing for The Independent, Helen Brown described it as "the most thrilling album of the year", praising the "Bond theme-level orchestration" in the production and Little Simz's lyricism. Rachel Aroesti, writing for The Guardian, concluded Sometimes I Might Be Introvert "may or may not provide a commercial boost for its maker, but this rich, fascinating album cements Little Simz’s significance regardless."

Entertainment Weekly noted that Little Simz "once again showcases her vulnerability, opening up old wounds from relationships with her father, a past lover, and, ultimately, herself." PJ Somerville from The Line of Best Fit commented that "Talking family, trauma, the industry and her peers, Sometimes I Might Be Introvert is tactical, theatrical, and is the product of 100,000 hours spent honing her craft resulting in a body of work with heart, and its head firmly on its shoulders." Granting the record Album of the Week, James Rettig for Stereogum declared Sometimes I Might Be Introvert as Simz's "most personal album yet but also her most removed, in the sense that it’s cinematic and surreal and overwhelming", praising the subject matter and "sweeping orchestral" production. PopMatters' John Amen praised the album, writing that Simz "moves from stream-of-consciousness confessions to epigrammatic observations, volatile rants to equanimous self-examinations, and personal confessions to broad societal diagnoses."

Accolades

Track listing

Notes
 "Introvert" and the five interludes feature additional vocals by Emma Corrin
 "Introvert" and "I See You" feature additional vocals by Cleo Sol

Sample credits
 "Two Worlds Apart" contains samples of "The Agony and the Ecstasy", written and performed by Smokey Robinson

Personnel
Musicians

 Little Simz – primary artist 
 Cleo Sol – featured artist 
 Obongjayar – featured artist 
 Inflo – production 
 Jakwob – production 
 Miles James – production 
 Emma Corrin – additional vocals
 Rosie Danvers – orchestral arrangements
 Graham Godfrey - percussion
 Caroline Adeyemi – vocals
 Paul Boldeau – vocals
 Phebe Edwards – vocals
 Patrick Linton – vocals
 Desrinea Ramus – vocals
 Olivia Williams – vocals
 Qudus Adidas St. Patrick – vocals

Technical

 Matt Colton – mastering
 Ben Baptie – engineering, mixing
 Richard Woodcraft – engineering, mixing
 Jeremy Cole – creative direction, artwork

Charts

References

2021 albums
Little Simz albums
Age 101 Music albums
AWAL albums
Mercury Prize-winning albums
Albums produced by Inflo